José Luis Borau Moradell (8 August 1929 – 23 November 2012) was a Spanish producer,  screenwriter,  writer, and film director. He won the Goya Award for Best Director in 2000 for Leo.

Borau was born in Zaragoza.  In addition to directing, he acted in some films, including Everyone Off to Jail in 1993.

He was president of the Spanish Academy of Motion Picture Arts and Sciences (1994–1998), and member of the jury at the 41st Berlin International Film Festival in 1991. In February 2008 he was elected to the B seat of the Real Academia Española.

Borau died on 23 December 2012 aged 83 in Madrid from a throat cancer.

Career
Born in Zaragoza. During the Spanish Civil War he was kept from school by his overprotecting parents. From an early age, Borau had great love for literature and films. Following family pressure, he studied law in his native Zaragoza and worked at Madrid's Ministry of Housing in 1957. He began his career working for the regional newspaper Heraldo de Aragón as film critic. He pursued his interest in filmmaking by moving to Madrid enrolling in the national film school IIEC (Instituto de Investigaciones y Experiencias de Cinematografia) where he specialized in film direction. He graduated with the short film En el Río (1960).

Borau followed this with a series of shorts and commercials for Spanish television. His first feature film was a genre film:  Brandy (1963), a low-budget Western starring Alex Nicol and Robert Hundar. Brandy was followed the next year by  Crimen de doble filo  Double edged crime  (1964), a brooding psychological thriller. These two films were received as just two commercial projects. In 1966, Borau launched his television career for the Spanish network TVE working on episodes of Dichoso Mundo (What a World), which starred stage actress Conchita Montes.

From 1962 until 1970, Borau taught screenwriting at the national film school EOC. Some of his students became the next generation of notable Spanish filmmakers including Antonio Drove, Manuel Gutiérrez Aragón,  Pilar Miró and Ivan Zulueta. While still teaching, Borau attempted to interest film producers in his scripts, but to no avail. As he did not like the films he was offered to direct either, he decided to create his own production company El Iman with capital he had made in advertisement for television. The first project that came out from El Iman was Un dos tres al escondite Inglés (Hide and Seek) (1969), a film directed by Ivan Zuleta. This project was followed by Jaime de Armiñán Mi querida señorita (My Dearest Senorita), with a script co-written by Borau. My Dearest Senorita, an unusual work in Spanish cinema, portrays the ignorance in some provincial areas of Spain through the tragic story of a man who was raised as a woman and doesn’t know his true identity. The film was a critical and commercial success and it was nominated for an Oscar in the foreign language category.

In 1973, Borau scripted, produced and directed his third film, his first very personal project, Hay que matar a B (B must die) (1973). The film has an international cast, including Darren McGavin, Patricia Neal and Stéphane Audran. Set in a fictitious Latin American country, Hay q matar a B was a political thriller clearly inspired by Francoist Spain. In 1975 Borau made the film for which he is best remembered Furtivos (Poachers) (1975). The plot, set in the woodlands of Segovia, is a stark story of violence incest and matricide. Co-scripted with Gutierrez Aragon,  Borau took the role of the regional governor in the film.  He fought the Francoist censorship to have his film released the way he intended. Furtivos  was a great commercial and critical success,  it won best film, Golden Shell,  at the San Sebastián International Film Festival becoming one of the key film of the political transition in Spain. His next project, was to produce and co script Camada Negra (Black litter) (1976) a film directed by Gutiérrez Aragón his writing partner in Furtivos.Camada Negra, a study of fascism's defining elements, like Furtivos became emblematic of Spanish films of that period.

In 1979 Borau undertook another international coproduction, La Sabina, a story of passion and superstition set in Andalusia with a cast of Spanish British and American actors including Jon Finch, Simon Ward, Ángela Molina and Carol Kane. That same year, Borau moved to Los Angeles in order to fulfill his longtime dream of making a film in Hollywood. Plagued by financial difficulties, he managed to complete Rio Abajo  (On the line)  (1983). The film, a drama centered on the Mexico US border that starred Victoria Abril and David Carradine, was blocked from competing in the Berlin film festival, where it had been presented as the Spanish entry, due to his unspanish look. On the line was generally well received in Spain, but failed to interest American distributors till 1988 and even then made a poor showing in the American market.

Borau seventh film, Tata mía  (1986), made in the style of Madrid comedies,  centers on Elvira, a former nun unprepared to face a world so different from her religious or familiar past,  her aging nanny is brought back to Madrid to help Elvira face the future. The film, an allegory of Spanish transition to democracy, had a stellar cast headed by  Carmen Maura,  Alfredo Landa and Imperio Argentina.

Filmography

Director

Actor

Novels
 Camisa de once varas, 2003 Tigre Juan Award winner for narrative
 Navidad, horrible navidad

Notes

References
D’Lugo, Marvin.  Guide to the Cinema of Spain. Greenwood Press, 1997. 
 Torres, Augusto M. Diccionario Espasa Cine Español. Espasa Calpe, 1994,

External links
 

1929 births
2012 deaths
People from Zaragoza
Spanish film directors
Film directors from Aragon
Spanish male screenwriters
Best Director Goya Award winners
Deaths from cancer in Spain
Deaths from laryngeal cancer